The Nierji Dam is an embankment dam on the Nen River just north of Morin Dawa and on the border of Inner Mongolia and Heilongjiang Province, China. The dam was constructed between 2001 and 2006 for several purposes to include hydroelectric power generation, flood control, navigation and water supply.

Design
The dam's power station contains four 62.5 MW Kaplan turbine-generators for a total installed capacity of 250 MW.

References

Dams in China
Rock-filled dams
Hydroelectric power stations in Heilongjiang
Hydroelectric power stations in Inner Mongolia
Dams completed in 2006
2006 establishments in China
Energy infrastructure completed in 2006